Mario Antonio Moreno González (born 4 December 1986 in Tlalixcoyan, Veracruz, México) is a Mexican football midfielder. He currently plays for Alebrijes de Oaxaca.

Moreno made his professional debut with Monarcas in 2006.

External links
 

1986 births
Living people
Footballers from Veracruz
Association football forwards
Atlético Morelia players
C.F. Mérida footballers
Toros Neza footballers
Instituto footballers
Liga MX players
Mexican expatriate footballers
Mexican footballers
Expatriate footballers in Argentina